The 1979–80 New York Rangers season was the franchise's 54th season. The Rangers qualified for the playoffs but bowed out in the second round to Shero's old team, the Philadelphia Flyers. The team's on- and off-ice activities during this campaign was the subject of Larry Sloman's 1982 book Thin Ice: A Season in Hell with the New York Rangers.

Regular season

Season Standings

Schedule and results

|- align="center" bgcolor="#CCFFCC"
| 1 || 10 || @ Toronto Maple Leafs || 6 - 3 || 1-0-0
|- align="center" bgcolor="#FFBBBB"
| 2 || 14 || Washington Capitals || 5 - 3 || 1-1-0
|- align="center" bgcolor="#CCFFCC"
| 3 || 18 || Vancouver Canucks || 6 - 3 || 2-1-0
|- align="center" bgcolor="#FFBBBB"
| 4 || 20 || @ Montreal Canadiens || 5 - 4 || 2-2-0
|- align="center" bgcolor="#CCFFCC"
| 5 || 21 || Pittsburgh Penguins || 6 - 3 || 3-2-0
|- align="center" bgcolor="#CCFFCC"
| 6 || 24 || Edmonton Oilers || 10 - 2 || 4-2-0
|- align="center" bgcolor="#FFBBBB"
| 7 || 25 || @ Philadelphia Flyers || 5 - 2 || 4-3-0
|- align="center" bgcolor="#FFBBBB"
| 8 || 27 || @ Minnesota North Stars || 7 - 2 || 4-4-0
|- align="center" bgcolor="white"
| 9 || 28 || Hartford Whalers || 2 - 2 || 4-4-1
|-

|- align="center" bgcolor="#FFBBBB"
| 10 || 1 || @ Los Angeles Kings || 4 - 2 || 4-5-1
|- align="center" bgcolor="#FFBBBB"
| 11 || 3 || @ Colorado Rockies || 7 - 2 || 4-6-1
|- align="center" bgcolor="#CCFFCC"
| 12 || 4 || @ Vancouver Canucks || 4 - 2 || 5-6-1
|- align="center" bgcolor="#CCFFCC"
| 13 || 7 || Los Angeles Kings || 8 - 4 || 6-6-1
|- align="center" bgcolor="#CCFFCC"
| 14 || 10 || Quebec Nordiques || 5 - 4 || 7-6-1
|- align="center" bgcolor="#FFBBBB"
| 15 || 11 || Pittsburgh Penguins || 4 - 1 || 7-7-1
|- align="center" bgcolor="#FFBBBB"
| 16 || 13 || @ New York Islanders || 10 - 5 || 7-8-1
|- align="center" bgcolor="#CCFFCC"
| 17 || 14 || Detroit Red Wings || 3 - 2 || 8-8-1
|- align="center" bgcolor="#FFBBBB"
| 18 || 16 || @ Atlanta Flames || 4 - 2 || 8-9-1
|- align="center" bgcolor="#CCFFCC"
| 19 || 18 || St. Louis Blues || 5 - 3 || 9-9-1
|- align="center" bgcolor="#FFBBBB"
| 20 || 21 || Winnipeg Jets || 6 - 4 || 9-10-1
|- align="center" bgcolor="#FFBBBB"
| 21 || 24 || @ Pittsburgh Penguins || 5 - 3 || 9-11-1
|- align="center" bgcolor="#FFBBBB"
| 22 || 25 || Toronto Maple Leafs || 4 - 3 || 9-12-1
|- align="center" bgcolor="white"
| 23 || 28 || Minnesota North Stars || 4 - 4 || 9-12-2
|- align="center" bgcolor="#FFBBBB"
| 24 || 29 || @ Buffalo Sabres || 2 - 1 || 9-13-2
|-

|- align="center" bgcolor="#CCFFCC"
| 25 || 1 || @ St. Louis Blues || 2 - 0 || 10-13-2
|- align="center" bgcolor="white"
| 26 || 3 || Montreal Canadiens || 3 - 3 || 10-13-3
|- align="center" bgcolor="white"
| 27 || 5 || Chicago Black Hawks || 3 - 3 || 10-13-4
|- align="center" bgcolor="#CCFFCC"
| 28 || 7 || @ Hartford Whalers || 7 - 4 || 11-13-4
|- align="center" bgcolor="#CCFFCC"
| 29 || 9 || New York Islanders || 5 - 4 || 12-13-4
|- align="center" bgcolor="#CCFFCC"
| 30 || 11 || @ Detroit Red Wings || 2 - 1 || 13-13-4
|- align="center" bgcolor="#CCFFCC"
| 31 || 12 || @ Chicago Black Hawks || 5 - 2 || 14-13-4
|- align="center" bgcolor="#FFBBBB"
| 32 || 15 || @ Washington Capitals || 5 - 4 || 14-14-4
|- align="center" bgcolor="white"
| 33 || 16 || Philadelphia Flyers || 1 - 1 || 14-14-5
|- align="center" bgcolor="#CCFFCC"
| 34 || 19 || Vancouver Canucks || 5 - 3 || 15-14-5
|- align="center" bgcolor="#CCFFCC"
| 35 || 22 || @ Pittsburgh Penguins || 4 - 3 || 16-14-5
|- align="center" bgcolor="#FFBBBB"
| 36 || 23 || Boston Bruins || 4 - 3 || 16-15-5
|- align="center" bgcolor="#CCFFCC"
| 37 || 30 || Washington Capitals || 5 - 2 || 17-15-5
|-

|- align="center" bgcolor="white"
| 38 || 2 || @ Quebec Nordiques || 3 - 3 || 17-15-6
|- align="center" bgcolor="#FFBBBB"
| 39 || 4 || Philadelphia Flyers || 5 - 3 || 17-16-6
|- align="center" bgcolor="white"
| 40 || 6 || Atlanta Flames || 5 - 5 || 17-16-7
|- align="center" bgcolor="#CCFFCC"
| 41 || 7 || Hartford Whalers || 5 - 2 || 18-16-7
|- align="center" bgcolor="#FFBBBB"
| 42 || 9 || @ Detroit Red Wings || 4 - 0 || 18-17-7
|- align="center" bgcolor="#CCFFCC"
| 43 || 11 || @ Edmonton Oilers || 6 - 2 || 19-17-7
|- align="center" bgcolor="#CCFFCC"
| 44 || 12 || @ Winnipeg Jets || 3 - 0 || 20-17-7
|- align="center" bgcolor="white"
| 45 || 14 || Colorado Rockies || 6 - 6 || 20-17-8
|- align="center" bgcolor="#CCFFCC"
| 46 || 16 || Winnipeg Jets || 4 - 1 || 21-17-8
|- align="center" bgcolor="#FFBBBB"
| 47 || 19 || @ Boston Bruins || 6 - 3 || 21-18-8
|- align="center" bgcolor="#FFBBBB"
| 48 || 20 || Chicago Black Hawks || 2 - 1 || 21-19-8
|- align="center" bgcolor="#CCFFCC"
| 49 || 22 || @ Los Angeles Kings || 5 - 4 || 22-19-8
|- align="center" bgcolor="#CCFFCC"
| 50 || 23 || @ Vancouver Canucks || 6 - 4 || 23-19-8
|- align="center" bgcolor="white"
| 51 || 27 || @ Colorado Rockies || 3 - 3 || 23-19-9
|- align="center" bgcolor="#FFBBBB"
| 52 || 31 || @ Buffalo Sabres || 6 - 2 || 23-20-9
|-

|- align="center" bgcolor="#CCFFCC"
| 53 || 2 || @ Washington Capitals || 6 - 3 || 24-20-9
|- align="center" bgcolor="#FFBBBB"
| 54 || 3 || @ Quebec Nordiques || 5 - 4 || 24-21-9
|- align="center" bgcolor="#CCFFCC"
| 55 || 10 || Quebec Nordiques || 3 - 1 || 25-21-9
|- align="center" bgcolor="#FFBBBB"
| 56 || 13 || @ Chicago Black Hawks || 3 - 1 || 25-22-9
|- align="center" bgcolor="#FFBBBB"
| 57 || 17 || Toronto Maple Leafs || 6 - 4 || 25-23-9
|- align="center" bgcolor="#FFBBBB"
| 58 || 18 || @ Hartford Whalers || 6 - 4 || 25-24-9
|- align="center" bgcolor="#CCFFCC"
| 59 || 20 || Edmonton Oilers || 4 - 1 || 26-24-9
|- align="center" bgcolor="#FFBBBB"
| 60 || 23 || @ Minnesota North Stars || 6 - 3 || 26-25-9
|- align="center" bgcolor="#CCFFCC"
| 61 || 24 || New York Islanders || 8 - 2 || 27-25-9
|- align="center" bgcolor="#CCFFCC"
| 62 || 27 || Los Angeles Kings || 5 - 4 || 28-25-9
|- align="center" bgcolor="#CCFFCC"
| 63 || 28 || @ Boston Bruins || 5 - 2 || 29-25-9
|-

|- align="center" bgcolor="#CCFFCC"
| 64 || 2 || Boston Bruins || 2 - 1 || 30-25-9
|- align="center" bgcolor="#CCFFCC"
| 65 || 5 || Buffalo Sabres || 4 - 2 || 31-25-9
|- align="center" bgcolor="#FFBBBB"
| 66 || 8 || @ Montreal Canadiens || 5 - 2 || 31-26-9
|- align="center" bgcolor="#CCFFCC"
| 67 || 9 || Minnesota North Stars || 4 - 2 || 32-26-9
|- align="center" bgcolor="#CCFFCC"
| 68 || 12 || Colorado Rockies || 6 - 0 || 33-26-9
|- align="center" bgcolor="#CCFFCC"
| 69 || 15 || @ Toronto Maple Leafs || 8 - 4 || 34-26-9
|- align="center" bgcolor="#CCFFCC"
| 70 || 16 || St. Louis Blues || 5 - 2 || 35-26-9
|- align="center" bgcolor="#FFBBBB"
| 71 || 19 || @ Edmonton Oilers || 4 - 2 || 35-27-9
|- align="center" bgcolor="#FFBBBB"
| 72 || 21 || @ Winnipeg Jets || 4 - 2 || 35-28-9
|- align="center" bgcolor="#FFBBBB"
| 73 || 23 || Montreal Canadiens || 6 - 1 || 35-29-9
|- align="center" bgcolor="white"
| 74 || 25 || Buffalo Sabres || 3 - 3 || 35-29-10
|- align="center" bgcolor="#FFBBBB"
| 75 || 28 || @ Atlanta Flames || 4 - 2 || 35-30-10
|- align="center" bgcolor="#CCFFCC"
| 76 || 29 || @ St. Louis Blues || 4 - 3 || 36-30-10
|- align="center" bgcolor="#CCFFCC"
| 77 || 31 || Detroit Red Wings || 7 - 5 || 37-30-10
|-

|- align="center" bgcolor="#FFBBBB"
| 78 || 2 || Atlanta Flames || 7 - 3 || 37-31-10
|- align="center" bgcolor="#FFBBBB"
| 79 || 5 || @ New York Islanders || 2 - 1 || 37-32-10
|- align="center" bgcolor="#CCFFCC"
| 80 || 6 || @ Philadelphia Flyers || 8 - 3 || 38-32-10
|-

Playoffs

Key:  Win  Loss

Player statistics
Skaters

Goaltenders

Goaltenders

†Denotes player spent time with another team before joining Rangers. Stats reflect time with Rangers only.
‡Traded mid-season. Stats reflect time with Rangers only.

Draft picks
New York's picks at the 1979 NHL Entry Draft in Montreal, Quebec, Canada.

Awards and records

Transactions

Farm teams

References

External links
 Rangers on Hockey Database

New York Rangers seasons
New York Rangers
New York Rangers
New York Rangers
New York Rangers
1980s in Manhattan
Madison Square Garden